A Train may refer to:

Rail transport 
 The A (New York City Subway service)
 A Division (New York City Subway)
 A-train (Texas), a hybrid rail line in Denton County, Texas
 A-Train (JR Kyushu), a train operated in Japan by JR Kyushu
 A-Train (Korail), a tourist train in South Korea
 MTR Adtranz–CAF EMU, a train operated in MTR Hong Kong
 Green Line A branch, in Boston, Massachusetts
 Key System, electric line between Oakland and San Francisco in 1958
 Hitachi A-train, trains made by Hitachi
 Arlanda Express, an airport rail link operated in Stockholm by A-Train AB
 A Line (Los Angeles Metro), a light rail line in Los Angeles County, California

Sports nickname for
 Mike Alstott (born 1973), American football player
 Matt Bloom (born 1972), American professional wrestler
 Artis Gilmore (born 1949), former basketball player
 Anthony Kelly (lacrosse) (born 1980), professional lacrosse player
 Anthony Thomas (American football) (born 1977), American football player
 Anton Volchenkov (born 1982), ice hockey defenceman
 Aaron Williams (basketball) (born 1971), professional basketball player

Other 
 A-Train, a 1985 series of video games
 A-train (satellite constellation), a string of meteorological and environmental Earth observation satellites
 A-Train, a superhero from the media franchise The Boys

See also
 "Take the "A" Train", 1939 jazz standard written by Billy Strayhorn
 Take the "A" Train (Betty Roché album), released 1956
 Take the "A" Train (Dexter Gordon album), released 1989

 Line A (disambiguation)